Walter Lötscher (born 11 August 1923) was a Swiss cross-country skier who competed in the 1950s. He finished 35th in the 18 km event at the 1952 Winter Olympics in Oslo.

External links
18 km Olympic cross country results: 1948-52

Olympic cross-country skiers of Switzerland
Cross-country skiers at the 1952 Winter Olympics
Swiss male cross-country skiers
1923 births
Possibly living people